Kim Yong-jun (born September 12, 1984) is a South Korean singer. He is a member of the band SG Wannabe. In 2009, he and then-real life girlfriend Hwang Jung-eum joined the second season of reality dating show We Got Married as the first real-life couple to be featured on the show.

Discography

Singles

Filmography

Television shows

Web shows

References

External links

1984 births
Living people
MBK Entertainment artists
South Korean contemporary R&B singers
South Korean television personalities
Kyung Hee Cyber University alumni
21st-century South Korean  male singers
South Korean male singer-songwriters